Ion Bostan (December 15, 1914, Chernowitz - May 29, 1992, Bucharest) was a documentary film director from Romania.

Awards
 Mamaia, 1964, Under the Eagle’s Wing
 Tehran, 1968, The Sarmatian Sea, the Black Sea
 Novi Sad, 1969, Histria, Heraclea and the Swans
 Rio de Janeiro, 1970, The Heron – a Reptile-Bird
 ACIN, 1972, The Sunken Forest
 Tehran, 1973, The Sunken Forest
 ACIN, 1973, Seagulls with Clean Wings
 ACIN, 1975, A Willing Robinson
 ACIN, 1976, The Storks Are Coming

Works
 The Sturgeon and Migrating Herring (1971)
 The Giant Beluga (1981)
 The Sturgeon Are Preparing for the Storm (1969)
 Fish and Fishermen (1971)
 The Swans’ Village (1974)
 Fishing amidst Pelicans and Water Lilies (1978)
 Sulina (1981)
 The Migration of Birds (1982)
 Gold, Silver and History (1982)
 Hitchcock’s Seagulls (1982)
 An Age-Old Profession: Fishing (1983)
 In the Green Jungle of the Depths (1983)
 The Floating Island (1983)
 The Flutter of Wings, Everywhere (1983)
 Oaks and Lianas (1983)
 The Pelicans Are Coming Back (1983)
 The Stone Whale – the Island of Popina (1985)
 When Water Lilies Bloom (1985)
 The Cormorants Were Flying Past (1986)
 “The Splendor of the Holy Frescoes” (1990)
 A Heavenly Crossroads (1992)

References

External links 
 The Danube Delta Seen Through The Eyes Of Ion Bostan
 

1914 births
1992 deaths
Mass media people from Chernivtsi
People from the Duchy of Bukovina
Romanian film directors
Documentary film directors